Archbishop Demetrios (born Demetrios Trakatellis) is a former elder archbishop of the Greek Orthodox Archdiocese of America and Exarch of the Atlantic and Pacific Oceans. He resigned from this position in 2019.

Biography
Demetrios was born in Thessaloniki, Greece on 1 February 1928 to Georgia and Christos Trakatellis.  He graduated in 1946 valedictorian from the Experimental School of the University of Thessaloniki.  He attended the School of Theology at the National and Kapodistrian University of Athens, graduating  summa cum laude in 1950. He became a deacon in 1960 and was ordained as a priest in 1964. He moved to the United States in 1965, attending the Harvard Graduate School of Arts and Sciences and obtaining his PhD in 1972. He later returned to the University of Athens, obtaining his Doctor of Theology degree in 1977. He served as auxiliary bishop to the Archbishop of Athens from 1967, and in 1968 declined to serve as metropolitan bishop of Attika and Megaris due to the political upheaval then taking place in Greece.

He was Distinguished Professor of Biblical Studies and Christian Origins at Hellenic College Holy Cross Greek Orthodox School of Theology in Brookline, Massachusetts, from 1983 to 1993, and was a visiting professor at Harvard Divinity School in 1984–85 and 1988–89. He returned to Greece in 1993 to serve at the Greek Orthodox Archdiocese of Athens.

On 18 September 1999, Elder Archbishop Demetrios was enthroned at the Archdiocesan Cathedral of the Holy Trinity as Primate of the Greek Orthodox Archdiocese of America.  The cathedral on New York City's Upper East Side serves as the national cathedral of the Greek Orthodox Archdiocese of America and is the seat of the Archbishop.

On 26 November 2015, the Greek Orthodox Archdiocese of America was elevated to the rank of Gerontiki Eparchy (an eparchy headed by a Geron/Elder hierarch) of the Ecumenical Throne, led by Demetrios, with the style of His Eminence Geron Archbishop Demetrios of America.

Academy and Holy Synod
Demetrios was elected as a member of the Academy of Athens in November 2002 and was inducted on 14 November 2003. He was elected to the Holy Synod of the Ecumenical Patriarchate on 19 February 2004.

Archbishop Demetrios delivered invocations at the Democratic National Convention on 27 August 2008 and the Republican National Convention on 4 September 2008.  He also delivered the benediction at the Presidential Inaugural Luncheon on 21 January 2013.

Resignation as Archbishop of America
Demetrios, whose leadership has been criticized by some as leading the Greek Orthodox Archdiocese of America into "financial, administrative, and spiritual bankruptcy," had been pressured three times beforehand by Patriarch Bartholomew, the Ecumenical Patriarch, to "voluntarily resign." After refusing each time, Bartholomew denied Demetrios another extension.

On 4 May 2019, Demetrios submitted his letter of resignation as Archbishop of America, effective on 9 May. His letter of resignation was made public on the scheduled date; hours later Bishop Andonios (Paropoulos) of Phasiane made Demetrios' letter of resignation as Chancellor of the Archdiocese of America public. On 11 May, Metropolitan Elpidophoros of Bursa was unanimously elected to succeed Demetrios, and Demetrios' resignation as Archbishop of America was made official.

Writings
Demetrios is the author of six books as well as hundreds of articles and essays published in various periodicals.

 Presence of the Holy Spirit (1984)
 Authority and Passion (1987)
 The Transcendent God of Eugnostos (1991)
 Christ, the Pre-existing God (1992)
 The Fathers Interpret (1996)
 A Call to Faith (2004)

Family
His brother, Antonios Trakatellis, is a New Democracy MEP for Greece and former Vice-President of the European Parliament.

References

External links

Archbishop Demetrios of America playlist on YouTube
ΑΡΧΙΕΠΙΣΚΟΠΟΣ ΓΕΡΩΝ ΑΜΕΡΙΚΗΣ' ΑΠΟ ΣΗΜΕΡΑ Ο ΑΜΕΡΙΚΗΣ ΔΗΜΗΤΡΙΟΣ ΜΕ ΑΠΟΦΑΣΗ ΤΗΣ ΣΥΝΟΔΟΥ"

1928 births
Living people
Clergy from Thessaloniki
Greek Macedonians
Harvard Graduate School of Arts and Sciences alumni
20th-century Eastern Orthodox archbishops
National and Kapodistrian University of Athens alumni
Archbishops of the Greek Orthodox Archdiocese of America
21st-century Eastern Orthodox archbishops
Greek expatriates in the United States
Greek expatriate bishops